Jahanara Rob is a Awami League politician and the former Member of Parliament of reserved seat.

Career
Rob was elected to parliament from a reserved seat as a Awami League candidate in 1973.

Personal life
Rob was married to Abdur Rob Boga Miah, a former President of Pabna District unit of Awami League and member of the Constituent Assembly of Bangladesh. He died in a road crash in 1973 while campaigning for the election.

Death
Rob died on 1 October 2014 in Square Hospital, Dhaka, Bangladesh.

References

Awami League politicians
2014 deaths
1st Jatiya Sangsad members
Women members of the Jatiya Sangsad
20th-century Bangladeshi women politicians